The 1991 Hong Kong Challenge was an invitational non-ranking snooker tournament held in Hong Kong in 1991. Stephen Hendry won the title, defeating James Wattana 9–1 in the final, and received £20,000 prize money, out of a total prize fund of £72,000. Gary Wilkinson compiled the highest break of the tournament, 125, during his quarter-final loss to Steve Davis.

Results

References

1991 in snooker
Sport in Hong Kong
1991 in Hong Kong
1991